Night of the Wild is a 2015 American television science fiction horror film directed by Eric Red and written by Delondra Williams. The film premiered on Syfy on October 3, 2015.

Plot
A green meteorite lands in a quiet town and turns many local dogs into vicious killers.

Cast 
 Rob Morrow as Dave
 Kelly Rutherford as Sara
 Tristin Mays as Rosalyn
 Carmen Tonry as Danielle
 Jill Zarin as Liz
 Mary Katherine O'Donnell as Alice Wise
 B.D. Boudreaux as Bill
 Mason Guccione as Casey
 Darrell Chumley as Chester
 Eric Ashton Spooner as Firefighter Eddie
 Dalton Alfortish as Ray
 Shanna Marie Burris as Misty
 Dylan Vox as Seth
 Christin Rankins as Groomer
 Andre Bauth as Sandoval
 Maria Robles as Kim

Reception

Reviewer Stabford Deathrage of culturedvultures.com called the film "unintentionally hilarious" and "completely ridiculous".

References

External links 
 
 

2015 horror films
2015 science fiction films
2015 television films
2015 films
2010s English-language films
Films directed by Eric Red
American horror television films
American science fiction television films
Films about dogs
2010s American films